The Kauai County Police Department (KPD) provides law enforcement for a population of 72,133 people within  of the island of Kauai.

Organization
The current chief of police is Todd Raybuck. The KPD currently employs approximately 150 sworn personnel and about 50 non-sworn civilian support staff. The KPD is divided into three bureaus:
Patrol Services Bureau- contains emergency dispatch, cell block, three patrol platoons, and a traffic safety section.
Investigative Services Bureau- is divided into three sections: Adult, Youth Services, and Vice.
Administrative and Technical Bureau- is largely a civilian support section and contains the following: Personnel, Records, Training, Identification (CSI), Evidence, Fleet, and Telecommunications (TTY).

Political Controversy
In the past, members of the Kauai Police department faced allegations of corruption and favoritism. In the early 2000s, former police chief, K.C. Lum, who was promoted from the vice division, was accused of favoritism, and ethics allegations. Additionally, the department faced sexual harassment allegations.  In September 2014, the department was unaccredited. The FBI also investigated the alleged Kauai Police corruption.
None of the officers who came under scrutiny is associated with the department any longer.

See also
 State of Hawaii Organization of Police Officers
Honolulu Police Department
 Hawaii Department of Public Safety
 List of law enforcement agencies in Hawaii

References

External links
Kauai County Police Department

County police departments of Hawaii
Kauai County, Hawaii